Anna Hannevik (born 9 August 1925) is a Norwegian Salvation Army Commissioner.

Biography
Hannevik was born in Datong, China, to missionaries Ingvald Andreas Hannevik and May Thompson. She held various positions in the Army in Norway, England and Ireland. She chaired the social work in Norway ("slumsøstrene") from 1968 to 1975, and the social work in Britain and Ireland from 1975. From 1982 she served as international secretary for the Salvation Army in Europe, and she served as Territorial Commander for the Sweden chapter of The Salvation Army from 1986 to 1990. She was decorated Commander of the Order of the Polar Star, and has received the Paul Harris Medal.

Selected works

References

Further reading

1925 births
Living people
People from Datong
Salvation Army officers
Norwegian Salvationists
Commissioners in The Salvation Army
Norwegian expatriates in the United Kingdom